Kinderwood is an American animated television series that premiered on the Noggin mobile app on December 3, 2020. The series was created by Otto Tang and developed by Carin Greenberg. It is produced by Titmouse, Inc. It is set in a fictional school called Kinderwood, which is able to transform into different environments. The main characters are the "Kinderkids," a group of five classmates who attend Kinderwood.

The series was first announced on December 1, 2020, and it was available early on Noggin's Amazon Video channel on the same day. On December 3, one episode of the series aired on Nickelodeon to promote its debut on Noggin. Commercials for the show's Noggin debut also played on Nickelodeon's networks.

Characters 
The five main characters are known as the "Kinderkids."
 Liddo (voiced by Judah Prehn), a white cat with a black bowler hat that obscures his ears.
 Fifi (voiced by Chloe Coleman), a shy and detail-oriented black and white dog.
 Luplup (voiced by Luke Lowe), a sweet loving yellow and white dog, and Fifi's little brother.
 Olive (voiced by Capri Oliver), a white duck who is the most curious and imaginative Kinderkid.
 DD (vocal effects provided by Otto Tang), an always stylish black and white cat who doesn't speak and only meows. He also expresses himself through thought balloons which the characters can see.

Episodes 
All episodes were directed by Allison Craig.

Reception 
Common Sense Media gave the show a five-star review. The staff reviewer, Ashley Moulton, said that the show's stories "emphasize that it's okay to feel negative emotions, that it's important to help other people, and being a good friend," and she summarized Kinderwood as a "lovely, kind-hearted show" with "oodles of charm."

The episode "What Sounds Like Thunder" was selected to compete in the Television Films category of the 2021 Annecy International Animation Film Festival.

References

External links 
 

2020s American animated television series
2020 American television series debuts
2021 American television series endings
American children's animated television series